Raida Abdallah Bader (born February 22, 1965) is a Jordanian Olympic athlete, she represented Jordan in 1984 Summer Olympics in Los Angeles. She was the first woman to represent Jordan at the Olympics.

Olympic participation

Los Angeles 1984
Bader was the youngest and the only female participant for Jordan in this tournament aged only 19 years and 168 days.

Athletics – Women's 3000 metres – Round One

References

1965 births
Living people
Jordanian female athletes
Athletes (track and field) at the 1984 Summer Olympics
Olympic athletes of Jordan